Malawi have participated in twelve Commonwealth Games, attending every one from 1970 onwards. They have won only three medals, all bronze and all in boxing.

Malawi (then known as Nyasaland) was part of Rhodesia and Nyasaland when Rhodesia and Nyasaland competed in 1962.

Medals

List of Medalists 
Malawi has won a total of three medals at the Commonwealth Games, all of them being bronze. Their first medal was at the 1970.

References

 
Nations at the Commonwealth Games
Comm